The 22nd Shanghai Television Festival took place in Shanghai, China between June 6 and June 10, 2016.

Winners and nominees

References

External links
 List of Nominees 

Shanghai Television Festival
2016 television awards
2016 in Chinese television